The Mangaia swiftlet (Aerodramus manuoi) is an extinct species of bird in the swift family. It became extinct during prehistoric times.  It was endemic to Mangaia in the Cook Islands.  It was closely allied with the extant Atiu swiftlet (Aerodramus sawtelli) of Atiu, Mangaia's neighbouring island, though it was probably slightly larger.

It was described from six fossil bones recovered from a Holocene rock shelter deposit on Mangaia. The coracoid and carpometacarpus of the new species are larger and very different qualitatively from those of the Atiu species.  This is the first species of Aerodramus to be described from fossils.

References

Notes

Sources
 

Mangaia swiftlet
Birds of Mangaia
Extinct birds of Oceania
Bird extinctions since 1500
Late Quaternary prehistoric birds
Mangaia swiftlet